For the aircraft of the same name, see Fiat AS.2 (aircraft)

The Fiat AS.2 was an Italian 12-cylinder, liquid-cooled V engine designed and built in the mid-1920s by Fiat Aviazione especially for the 1926 Schneider Trophy air race.

Design and development
Designed for the 1926 Schneider Trophy contest held at Hampton Roads, Virginia, the AS.2 was inspired by the American Curtiss D-12 engine. Unlike the D-12 the engine featured separate steel cylinders and cast aluminium alloy cylinder heads.  The starting point for the Italian engine was the earlier Fiat A.22. The 'S' in AS stood for 'Spinto' (thrust). A weakness of the engine was its magnesium alloy pistons, a new engineering material at the time. Many pistons were holed. Despite the engine's technical problems it was successful at the Schneider Trophy event, winning on 13 November 1926, with a second AS.2 powered aircraft placing third.

Applications
Macchi M.39

Specifications (AS.2)

See also

References

Notes

Bibliography

Eves, Edward  The Schneider Trophy Story. Shrewsbury. Airlife Publishing Ltd., 2001. .
Gunston, Bill. World Encyclopedia of Aero Engines. Cambridge, England. Patrick Stephens Limited, 1989. 

AS.2
1920s aircraft piston engines